Keith Leveret Wauchope (October 13, 1941 Manhattan - October 10, 2021) was an American Career Foreign Service Officer who served concurrent appointments as the Ambassador Extraordinary and Plenipotentiary to Gabon and São Tomé and Príncipe (1989-1992).

He grew up on the South Shore (Long Island), Sheepshead Bay, Brooklyn and Lloyd Harbor, New York.  After initially attending local public schools, he went to Staunton Military Academy before transferring to the Boston Latin School and from there, Johns Hopkins University (Class of 1963).  He started out as an engineering major but ended up concentrating in history.

References

1941 births
Living people
Ambassadors of the United States to Gabon
Ambassadors of the United States to São Tomé and Príncipe
People from Lloyd Harbor, New York
People from Sheepshead Bay, Brooklyn
Boston Latin School alumni
Johns Hopkins University alumni
Staunton Military Academy alumni
20th-century American diplomats